Azalaïs d'Arbaud (née Marie-Azalaïs Valère-Martin; 1834-1917) was a French writer in the Occitan language. She lived in Meyrargues, Bouches-du-Rhône. She worked at Amarna Prouvençau, and in 1860 wrote Madaleno e lou tavan Rous (the first poem written by a woman and included in the Amarna since its creation in 1855). La Dourgueto followed in 1862. In 1888, she was awarded the first prize at the Jeux Floraux at Digne for l'Anello d'or. Arbaud was the wife of Count Felix Arbaud; she was the mother of the poet Joseph d'Arbaud and a daughter, Berthe.

Selected works
 Madaleno e lou tavan 
  La Dourgueto 
 Lis amouro de ribas (1863)

References

1834 births
1917 deaths
French women writers
Occitan-language writers